Peter Majerník (born 31 December 1978) is a Slovak footballer who plays as a centre back who plays for FK Inter Bratislava. His former club was FC Brașov, in the Romanian Liga I.

References

External links
 Profile on MFK Ružomberok website
 

1978 births
Living people
Sportspeople from Piešťany
Slovak footballers
Association football midfielders
MŠK Púchov players
FK Inter Bratislava players
MFK Ružomberok players
FC Brașov (1936) players
Spartak Myjava players
FC DAC 1904 Dunajská Streda players
Slovak Super Liga players
Liga I players
Slovak expatriate footballers
Expatriate footballers in Romania
Slovak expatriate sportspeople in Romania